The  is a Japanese regional political party based in Tokyo founded by Takashi Tachibana on 20 May 2020. The party is named after Takafumi Horie, an Internet entrepreneur whose nickname is "Horiemon", which is derived from time-traveling cartoon robot cat Doraemon; however, Horie has publicly disclaimed any connection to the party.

Ideology
The party's policies include "stopping the infodemic" and reopening Tokyo in wake of the COVID-19 pandemic. Other policies include abolishing cash, abolishing road tolls and public transport ticketing, rebuilding Edo Castle and legalizing cannabis.  The party has also inherited many policies from its national affiliate, The Party to Protect the People from NHK, including abolishing Japanese state broadcaster NHK and eliminating TV license fees.

Electoral history
The party unsuccessfully contested the 2020 Tokyo gubernatorial election, winning 0.72% of the vote.  Yuriko Koike of Tomin First was re-elected with 59.70%.

References

External links
 

2020 establishments in Japan
Political parties established in 2020
Regional parties in Japan
Politics of Tokyo